Ricinus is a genus of chewing lice which parasitise birds. It is the largest genus of chewing lice found parasitizing Passeriformes.

The genus Ricinus, including Ricinus communis, the castorbean plant, also exists in botany - this is possible, since the names of animals and plants are ruled by different nomenclature codes.

References

Lice